Judocus de Vos (1661–1734) was a Flemish weaver. He produced many tapestries, many commissioned to depict events from the War of the Spanish Succession. He also worked on the tapestries of St John's Co-Cathedral in Malta.

Bibliography
 Jeri Bapisola, Threads of History: The Tapestries of Blenheim Palace. (Lightmoor Press, 2005).
 K. Brosens, Brussels Tapestry Producer Judocus de Vos (1661/62-1734). New Data and Design Attributions. Studies in the Decorative Arts, vol. IX, no. 2 (2002).
 Alan Wace, The Marlborough Tapestries at Blenheim Palace. (London, 1968).

1661 births
1734 deaths
Flemish tapestry artists